Prayer for a Lost Mitten is a Canadian documentary film, directed by Jean-François Lesage and released in 2020. The film centres on the lost and found office of the Montreal Metro system.

The film premiered as part of the 2020 Hot Docs Canadian International Documentary Festival. Due to the COVID-19 pandemic in Canada it was not screened theatrically, but premiered as part of the festival's online streaming component. It was named the winner of the festival's Best Canadian Feature Documentary award.

Awards
The film received three Prix Iris nominations at the 23rd Quebec Cinema Awards in 2021, for Best Cinematography in a Documentary (Marianne Ploska), Best Original Music in a Documentary (Tom Brunt) and Best Sound in a Documentary (Marie-Andrée Cormier, Olivier Germain, Marie-Pierre Grenier). In 2022, the film was shortlisted for the Prix collégial du cinéma québécois.

The film received a Canadian Screen Award nomination for Best Feature Length Documentary, and Ploska won the award for Best Cinematography in a Documentary, at the 10th Canadian Screen Awards in 2022.

References

External links

2020 films
2020 documentary films
Canadian documentary films
Documentary films about Montreal
Quebec films
2020s French-language films
French-language Canadian films
2020s Canadian films